Maria Vasilkovna of Polotsk (?-1194), was a Grand Princess of the Kiev by marriage to Sviatoslav III of Kiev, Grand Prince of Kiev (r. 1174, 1177–1180, 1182–1194).  

She had great influence and participated in politics as advisor to her spouse. In 1180, she advised her spouse to form an alliance with the Olgovychi, and participated in the meeting where Davyd Rostislavich was excluded. On her advise, her spouse also forged an alliance with Rostyslavychs, which secured stability in the territory during the reign of her spouse.

References

Year of birth unknown
Date of death unknown
Kievan Rus' princesses
12th-century Rus' women